The Wild Horse Valley AVA is an American Viticultural Area whose borders overlap both Napa County and Solano County, California and is partially contained within the Napa Valley AVA.  The appellation's southerly location results in more hours of sunshine than other locations in Napa Valley or nearby Green Valley.  The proximity to San Pablo Bay results in a cooler climate, making Wild Horse Valley attractive for the cultivation of grapes like Pinot noir.

Geography and climate
The Wild Horse Valley AVA features two distinct subregions. To the west, the area is cooled by San Pablo Bay, although the elevation keeps the area above the fogline. The eastern half, being protected by the slope of the ground, is much warmer. The soil type is generally volcanic throughout the entire AVA.

History
Grapes were first planted in the area in the 1880s. The current vineyard plantings date back to 1980, with commercial production starting in 1985.

Wild Horse Vineyard

The largest vineyard in the Wild Horse Valley AVA was the Wild Horse Vineyard of Napa Valley.

Neglected crops can become places for pests to become established and then spread. The European Grapevine Moth (EGVM) larvae feed on grapes, and was first found in Napa Valley in 2009. Since then, Napa Valley has spent nearly $60 million to eradicate the moth.

The recent wildfires destroyed the Wild Horse Valley vineyards.

References 

American Viticultural Areas of the San Francisco Bay Area
Geography of Napa County, California
Geography of Solano County, California
American Viticultural Areas
1988 establishments in California